Rameshbhai Oza, popularly known as, Pujya Bhaishri is an Indian Hindu spiritual leader, singer and preacher of the Vedanta philosophy.

Early life
Ramesh Oza was born on 31 August 1957 at Devka village near Rajula, Saurashtra, Gujarat, India. He was born in unewal Brahmin family of Vrajlal Kanjibhai Oza and Laxmiben Oza. He completed his initial education at Tatvajyoti, a Sanskrit school at Rajula. Eventually, he moved to Mumbai, where he completed his primary education and completed graduation in commerce. He was inspired by his uncle, Jeevaraj Oza who was narrator of the Bhagavata Purana. His uncle noticed his interest that led him to study and practice religious scriptures.

Career
He held his first discourse on the Bhagavata Purana at the age of 13 at Gangotri. At the age of 18, he held Bhagavata Purana recitation in central Mumbai. He has conducted numerous recitations across the world since then.

He founded religious and educational institutes namely Devka Vidyapith and Sandipani Vidyaniketan near Ranghavav village and Porbandar Aerodrome. Hindu Smitoday, in recognition of his social and spiritual contributions, awarded him Hindu of the Year in 2006.

References

External links
 Official website

Indian Hindu religious leaders
Gujarati people
20th-century Hindu religious leaders
21st-century Hindu religious leaders
Living people
1957 births